McCoy Creek may refer to:

McCoy Creek (Michigan), a tributary of the St. Joseph River
McCoy Creek (Missouri), a stream